Nakuru Town Constituency is a former electoral constituency in Kenya. The constituency was established for the 1963 elections. The entire constituency was located within Nakuru municipality. In 2010, the constituency was split into Nakuru Town East Constituency and Nakuru Town West Constituency.

Members of Parliament

Locations and wards

References

External links 
Map of the constituency

Nakuru County
Constituencies in Rift Valley Province
Nakuru
1963 establishments in Kenya
Constituencies established in 1963
Former constituencies of Kenya